Néstor Fabián Morais González (born March 6, 1980 in Montevideo) is a Uruguayan footballer currently playing for Villa Teresa in the Uruguayan Segunda División.

Teams
  Liverpool 2000
  Rentistas 2001–2002
  Unión Española 2002
  Cerro 2003
  Plaza Colonia 2003–2005
  Envigado 2005
  Uruguay Montevideo 2006–2009
  Pérez Zeledón 2010–2011
  Progreso 2011–2012
  Atlético Policial 2012–2013
  Villa Teresa 2013–present

References
 
 Profile at Tenfield Digital  

1980 births
Living people
Uruguayan footballers
Uruguayan expatriate footballers
Liverpool F.C. (Montevideo) players
C.A. Rentistas players
C.A. Cerro players
Uruguay Montevideo players
C.A. Progreso players
Municipal Pérez Zeledón footballers
Unión Española footballers
Envigado F.C. players
Chilean Primera División players
Categoría Primera A players
Expatriate footballers in Chile
Expatriate footballers in Colombia
Expatriate footballers in Costa Rica
Association football forwards